Asitha Rathnaweera was a Sri Lankan cricketer. He was a right-handed batsman and right-arm bowler who played for Panadura Sports Club.

Rathnaweera made two first-class appearances for the team, during the 1994–95 season, taking a single catch on his debut, but failing to score a single run from the tailend.

He scored just a single run in his second, and final, first-class appearance, and took a single catch - that of veteran Test player Aravinda de Silva.

External links
Asitha Rathnaweera at Cricket Archive 

Sri Lankan cricketers
Panadura Sports Club cricketers
Living people
Place of birth missing (living people)
Year of birth missing (living people)